Defibrillation threshold indicates the minimum amount of energy needed to return normal rhythm to a heart that is beating in a cardiac dysrhythmia. Typical examples are the minimum amount of energy, expressed in joules, delivered by external defibrillator paddles or pads, required to break atrial fibrillation and restore normal sinus rhythm. Other common scenarios are restoring normal rhythm from atrial flutter, ventricular tachycardia or ventricular fibrillation.
The defibrillation threshold ranking in these settings, from lowest to highest, would be, in order, ventricular tachycardia, atrial flutter, atrial fibrillation, ventricular fibrillation. The highest amount of energy that an external defibrillator can deliver at the present time is 360 joules biphasic. In clinical practice, the real threshold can be approximated but not exactly established, since the defibrillating shock can be delivered only once. Certain medications, in particular sotalol, tend to lower such threshold, while others, such as amiodarone, may increase it.

Defibrillation threshold is a concept also applicable to internal or implantable cardiac defibrillators. The test needed to establish the defibrillation threshold is often referred to as DFT.

References

Cardiac electrophysiology